Walter Tausch was a 20th-century Austrian photojournalist, based in Sarajevo, who recorded the last images of Archduke Franz Ferdinand of Austria and his wife minutes before their assassination 28 June 1914, and documented the arrest of a suspect in Sarajevo, erroneously believed to be assassin Gavrilo Princip. Tausch's photographs were sold and published around the world, contributing to public shock and outrage. Walter Tausch's images are part of the History Museum of Bosnia and Herzegovina's permanent photography collection.

Biography

Walter Tausch was the owner a studio called  (Sarajevo Photographic Art Institute, next to the Apollo Theatre) on Kulovica Street in Sarajevo. Tausch moved to Sarajevo on behalf of the Austro-Hungarian government in 1910 and immediately opened his studio. Tausch became president of the “Association of Professional Photographers” from Bosnia and Herzegovina.

Sarajevo
Tausch captured the arrival of the Archduke and the Duchess in Ilidža, occupied Bosnia, on their arrival at the train station, the greeting of the Duchess Hohenberg by the head of the state at Hotel Bosna in Ilidža, the departure of the couple from the city hall of Sarajevo after the first bomb attack and a few minutes before the fateful revolver attack on 28 June 1914, the journey through the streets in an automobile, including the scene of the first (bomb) attack by Nedeljko Čabrinović, and right after the assassination attempt, the escorting of the murderer Gavrilo Princip and his comrades to prison.

Walter Tausch is widely credited as the professional photographer who took pictures at the scene of the assassination. His professional reputation explains why he was able to secure an accreditation as an official photographer for the duration of the Archduke's visit to Sarajevo, and why he is most likely the author of the iconic image of the arrest of a suspect in Sarajevo. The Österreichs Illustrierte Zeitung credited Walter Tausch on its 5 July 1914 front cover featuring the image of the arrest. Walter Tausch was one of the few Austrians who stayed in Sarajevo after WWI, in 1919 he took pictures of Sarajevo's old Bazar.

References

Sources
 
 
 
 
 
 

20th-century Austrian photographers
Pioneers of photography